Dmitri Igorevich Borisov (born 8 November 1996) is a Russian football player.

Club career
He made his debut in the Russian Football National League for FC Sokol Saratov on 23 August 2015 in a game against FC KAMAZ Naberezhnye Chelny.

References

External links
 Profile by Russian Football National League

1996 births
Sportspeople from Saratov
Living people
Russian footballers
Association football midfielders
FC Sokol Saratov players
FC Dynamo Kirov players